The D.O. Harton House is a historic house at 607 Davis Street in Conway, Arkansas.  It is a -story wood-frame structure, with a hip roof, weatherboard siding, and a brick foundation.  A hip-roof dormer projects from the front of the roof, and a single-story porch extends across the front, supported by wooden box columns with Classical detailing.  Built in 1913, it is a well-kept example of a vernacular American Foursquare house, built by D.O. Harton, Jr., a local contractor.

The house was listed on the National Register of Historic Places in 1996.

See also
National Register of Historic Places listings in Faulkner County, Arkansas

References

Houses on the National Register of Historic Places in Arkansas
Houses completed in 1913
Houses in Conway, Arkansas
National Register of Historic Places in Faulkner County, Arkansas